The 2000–01 New York Islanders season was the 29th season in the franchise's history. The team missed the Stanley Cup playoffs for the seventh consecutive season.

Off-season

Regular season
Defenseman Kenny Jonsson resigns the captaincy; the role is left vacant for the rest of the season.

The Islanders finished the regular season as the most penalized team in the NHL, with 445 power-play opportunities against.

Final standings

Schedule and results

Player statistics

Regular season
Scoring

Goaltending

Awards and records

Transactions

Draft picks
New York's draft picks at the 2000 NHL Entry Draft held at the Pengrowth Saddledome in Calgary, Alberta.

See also
 2000–01 NHL season

References
 

New York Islanders seasons
New York Islanders
New York Islanders
New York Islanders
New York Islanders